Westpower Limited is an electricity distribution business based in Greymouth, New Zealand. The company owns and operates the electricity distribution network in the Westland and Grey districts, and part of the Buller District. The company is wholly owned by the West Coast Electric Power Trust.

The network covers the towns of Reefton, Runanga, Greymouth, Hokitika, Ross, Franz Josef and Fox Glacier.

In August 2019 the company's proposed hydro project on the Waitaha River was denied a concession by the Department of Conservation.

Network statistics

References

External links 

 

Electric power distribution network operators in New Zealand